Gebelein (Egyptian Arabic: , Two Mountains; Egyptian: Inerty or Per-Hathor; Ancient Greek:   or  ; Latin: Pathyris or Aphroditopolis) was a town in Egypt. It is located on the Nile, about 40 km south of Thebes, in the New Valley Governorate.

The modern geographic area is known as Naga el-Gherira.

Archaeology

Gebelein is known for its cemetery, where archeological finds stretching from the Predynastic Period to the Middle Kingdom have been made. Archaeological interest in the town started in the early 18th century AD and was included in Benoît de Maillet's Description de l'Egypte. As well as official excavations, many artifacts from the site were traded on the antiquities market and can be found in the museums of Turin, Cairo, Berlin, Lyons, and the British Museum.

Predynastic mummies

The Gebelein predynastic mummies are six naturally mummified bodies, dating to approximately 3400 BC from the Late Predynastic period of Egypt, and were the first complete pre-dynastic bodies to be discovered. The well-preserved bodies were excavated at the end of the nineteenth century by Wallis Budge, the British Museum Keeper for Egyptology, from shallow sand graves near Gebelein (modern name Naga el-Gherira) in the Egyptian desert.

A Pre-dynastic mummified body dated to 3400 BC, excavated from this site, has been on display in the British Museum since 1901.

Temple of Hathor
The site includes the remains from a temple to Hathor with a number of cartouches on mud bricks and a royal stela from the Second to Third Dynasties.
The temple is located on the east hill of the site. Items of several Second Intermediate Period rulers include  a stele of Dedumose II, a block of Djedankhre Montemsaf, and a stela of a ruler named Sekhemtawy. Hyksos rulers mentioned are Apophis (on a lintel) and Khyan (on a black granite block).

Later period finds include a brick naming the High Priest of Amun Menkheperre and his wife Isetemkheb. The brick likely came from the Fort that enclosed the temple.
From the Ptolemaic period came fragments of a statue of Ptolemy VIII Euergetes II Limestone fragments from the shrine that would have held the statue were also found.

Ptolemaic period military camp
During the reign of Ptolemy VI Philometor, a military camp was established at Gebelein after the Theban rebellion of 186 B.C. The camp was destroyed by rebel forces 88 BC and the site was never again inhabited on a larger scale. Several hundred Demotic and Greek papyri and ostraca pertaining to the soldiers and the local temple were found at the ruins between 1890 and 1930. These including the archive of the mercenary Horos son of Nechoutes and the Dryton and Apollonia Archive.

External links
Egyptian artefacts at the Musée de Confluences, Lyon
Egyptian artefacts from Gebelein at the British Museum, London

References

Archaeological sites in Egypt
Populated places in Qena Governorate